Seva Gunitsky is an American political scientist. He is an associate professor of political science at the University of Toronto. His research focuses on the ways global forces and international politics affect democracy and domestic politics. He is the author of Aftershocks: Great Powers and Domestic Reforms in the Twentieth Century, which examines how shocks in the international system affect regime types. The book was selected by Foreign Affairs magazine as one of the best books of 2017. He has also published commentary and analysis in The Washington Post, Foreign Affairs, and The New Republic. Gunitsky is a frequent commentator on Russian politics and foreign policy.

Gunitsky was born in Leningrad, Soviet Union. He migrated to the United States at the age of 10, right around the time of the August Putsch, and spoke about having to relearn Russian after immigration, a common problem for Russophone immigrant children.

References 

American political scientists
Russian political scientists
Living people
American international relations scholars
Year of birth missing (living people)